Schröder (Schroeder) is a German surname often associated with the Schröder family. Notable people with the surname include:

 Arthur Schröder (1892–1986), German actor
 Atze Schröder, stage name of German comedian Hubertus Albers
 Bernd Schröder (born 1942), German football manager
 Björn Schröder (born 1968), German and Swiss curler and coach
 Björn Schröder (born 1980), German cyclist
 Bob Schroder (born 1944), American baseball player
 Carly Schroeder (born 1990), American actress
 Christa Schroeder (1908–1984), Adolf Hitler's personal secretary
 Christian Mathias Schröder (1778–1860), German politician
 Corina Schröder (born 1986), German footballer
 Dennis Schröder (born 1993), German basketball player
 Diana Schröder (born 1975), German artistic gymnast
 Dominik Schröder (1910–1974), German ethnologist
 Doris Schröder-Köpf (born 1963), German journalist
 Edward Schröder (1858–1942), German Germanist and mediaevalist
 Ernst Schröder (1841–1902), German logician and mathematician
 Frank Schröder (born 1962), East German skier
 Friedrich Schröder (1910–1972), German composer
 Friedrich Ludwig Schröder (1744–1816), German actor
 F.W. Schröder-Schrom (1879–1956), German actor
 Gerhard Schröder (disambiguation)
 Gerhard Schröder (1910–1989), German politician
 Gerhard Schröder (1921–2012), German radio and television executive
 Gerhard Schröder (born 1944), German politician, Chancellor of Germany
 Gerco Schröder (born 1978), Dutch show jumping equestrian
 Greta Schröder (1892–1967), German actress
 Gustav Schröder (1885–1959), German sea captain who in 1939 attempted to save 937 German Jewish passengers on his ship, MS St. Louis, from the Nazis
 Gustaviana Schröder (1701–1763) Swedish singer
 Han Schröder (1918–1992), Dutch architect
 Hans Schröder (disambiguation)
 Hans Schröder (1906–1970), German international footballer
 Hans Schröder (1931–2010), German sculptor and painter
 Heinrich G. F. Schröder (1810–1885), German natural scientist
 Jaap Schröder (1925–2020), Dutch violinist
 Jan Schröder (1941–2007), Dutch cyclist
 Jan-Christian Schröder (born 1998), German chess grandmaster
 Johann Heinrich Schröder (1784–1883), German-British banker
 Johannes Schröder (born 1991), German organist, composer and Catholic church musician
 John Schroder (born 1961), American businessman
 Jürgen Schröder (disambiguation)
 Jürgen Schröder (born 1940), German politician (CDU)
 Jürgen Schröder (born 1940), German rower
 Jürgen Schröder (born 1960), German water polo player
 Karl Schröder (disambiguation)
 Karl Schröder I (1816–1890), German violinist
 Karl Schröder II (1848–1935), German cellist, composer and conductor
 Karl Schröder (1884–1950), German communist politician
 Karl Schröder, West German canoeist
 Karl Ludwig Schröder, (1877–1940) German screenwriter, director, agent
 Katrin Schröder (born 1967), East German rower
 Kristina Schröder (born Köhler 1977), German politician
 Kurt Schröder (1888–1962), German composer
 Magdalena Schröder (born 1990), Swedish politician
 Marianne Schroeder (born 1949), Swiss pianist and composer
 Marianne Schröder (born 1977), Norwegian model
 Marianne Schröder (chess player) (1937–1970), German chess master
 Marie Schröder (1845–1917, Marie Hanfstängl), German singer
 Martin Schröder (disambiguation)
 Martin Schröder (born 1931), Dutch pilot and businessman
 Martin Schröder (born 1954), British chemist
 Matthias Schröder, German Paralympic athlete
 Michael Schröder (born 1959), German footballer
 Nic Schröder (born 1980), Swedish singer and actor
 Ole Schröder (born 1971), German politician
 Otto Schröder (born 1902), German fencer
 Rainer M. Schröder (born 1951), German novelist
 Rayk Schröder (born 1974), German footballer
 Richard Schröder (born 1921), Nazi German military officer
 Richard Schroeder (born 1961), American swimmer
 Ricky Schroder (born 1970), American actor
 Rudolf Alexander Schröder (1878–1962), German poet
 Simone Schröder (born 1964), German contralto and academic teacher
 Sophia Schröder (1712–1750), Swedish singer
 Sophie Schröder (1781–1868), German actress
 Soren Schroder, American businessman, CEO of Bunge Limited
 Thomas Schröder (born 1961), East German sprinter
 Thomas D. Schroeder (born 1959), American lawyer
 Truus Schröder-Schräder (1889–1985), Dutch socialite
 Ursula Schröder-Feinen (1936–2005), German singer
 Wilfrid Schroder (1946–2013), Associate Justice of the Kentucky Supreme Court
 Wilhelm Schröder (1896–1979), German military officer
 Wilhelmine Schröder-Devrient (1804–1860), German singer
 Wilhelmine Schröder, (1839–1924),  Swedish writer
 Willi Schröder (1928–1999), German footballer
 Willy Schröder (1912–1990), German discus thrower
 Wim Schröder (born 1971), Dutch show jumping equestrian

German-language surnames
Low German surnames
Occupational surnames